The Bermuda Sea Cadet Corps was created as a registered charity under the Bermuda Sea Cadet Association Act, 1968. The first unit had actually been created two years earlier.

History

Despite Bermuda's historical maritime economy, and its long period as a naval base and dockyard, there were no Sea Cadet units on the island before that date. This was even though Army Cadets had been established in the 19th Century, and the Air Training Corps had been established locally during the Second World War. A number of former members of the Royal Navy, Royal Naval Reserve, and Royal Naval Volunteer Reserve in Bermuda decided to rectify the omission, and the Corps, effectively a branch of the UK Sea Cadet Corps, but administered separately by a local Executive Council, soon comprised three shore units, known as Training Ships. These are all located on former naval properties. TS Bermuda is located on the grounds of the former Admiralty House, in Spanish Point, Pembroke (near the capital of Bermuda, the City of Hamilton). TS Admiral Somers is named for the founder of Bermuda, and Admiral of the Virginia Company, Sir George Somers. It is located at Convict Bay, St. George's, which takes its name from the prison hulks the Admiralty moored there at the turn of the 18th/19th Centuries, when the area was used as a naval base before the re-location to the West End. The area was also used by the Royal Canadian Navy during the Second World War, commissioned as HMCS Somers Isles The last unit, TS Venture, is located on Ireland Island, the core of the Royal Navy lands in Bermuda, and the location of the Royal Naval Dockyard.

Organisation and Training

The Executive Council of the Corps is responsible for the overall sponsorship, financing, support and administration of the Corps. While the Council members are not uniformed personnel, many members over the years have been retired naval officers, including former Presidents of the BSCA Captain Sir David Tibbits, RN, DSC, and Captain Gilbert Hallam, RN.

TS Bermuda, the first unit opened, is nominally the Headquarters unit. Each unit has its own Management Committee, responsible for raising funds for the unit's expenses. All officers in the Bermuda Sea Cadet Corps are members of the Royal Naval Reserve, and their names are followed by "RNR (SCC)". The rank bars worn on the cuffs of their jackets, and on epaulettes of shirts and pullovers follow the pattern of the old Royal Naval Volunteer Reserve, being 'wavy', instead of straight. Each unit is under the command of a Commander, or a Lieutenant-Commander, RNR (SCC), with junior officers, Warrant Officers, and Cadet Instructors, Cadet Petty Officers, and cadet ratings making-up the rest of the command structure.

Before the Royal Naval Base on Ireland Island, HMS Malabar, closed in 1995, the Corps maintained a close relationship with it, with the commanding officer of the base having inspected the units annually. Cadets often are attached to Royal Navy vessels for sea experience, and also train on the UK Sea Cadet Corps tall ship, . The Corps has also taken a leading interest in the building of Bermuda's own tall ship for youth training, the Spirit of Bermuda. Commander Anthony Lightbourne, RNR (SCC) is a Director of the Bermuda Sloop Foundation, which built and operates the traditionally designed vessel.
Female cadets and instructors had technically belonged nominally to the Girls Nautical Training Corps (GNTC), although practically they served within the Bermuda Sea Cadet Corps units. This distinction ceased in 1992, when the GNTC was merged into the Sea Cadet Corps in the UK and Bermuda.

Uniform
The Corps wears the cold water Royal Navy ceremonial uniform, of Navy blue trousers and jerseys (differentiated by Sea Cadet Corp shoulder titles worn above rating badges at the top of the sleeves). A white square-front shirt and white crowned caps (originally part of the tropical uniform, but now worn by the Royal Navy with the cold water uniform) is also used. Whereas the Royal Navy staff of HMS Malabar had worn tropical uniform (white shorts, square-front shirt, and cap) during the summer months, the Bermuda Sea Cadet Corps wears the cold water uniform in shirt-sleeve order. The working uniform is the No. 8 Dress, composed of blue shirt and darker blue trousers, Navy blue pullover sweater and Navy blue beret with "Sea Cadet Corps" badge (although this badge with the addition of the word "Bermuda" is used on some signs, it is not an item of uniform). Rating badges in red are worn on dark blue cloth slides on the shoulders of this uniform, which are also marked "SCC". The guards of the units wear whitened 1937 Pattern belts with brass furniture and anklets.

Cadet rating' badges

Adult Officers rank badges

Weapons
Each unit holds Lee-Enfield No. 4, Mk. I and No. 4, Mk. II rifles, deactivated for drill purpose only (any training in marksmanship is done with the Royal Bermuda Regiment using borrowed rifles). Edged weapons used for ceremonial duties include the No. 9,  MkI Bayonet (used with the No. 4 rifle), and Royal Naval pattern swords and dirks for use by officers.

References

External links
Bermuda Sea Cadet Corps
The Sea Cadet Corps
Bermuda Sloop Foundation

British Cadet organisations
Naval education and training in the United Kingdom
Sail training associations
Military of Bermuda